The Michigan Intercollegiate Athletic Association (MIAA) is an athletic conference that competes in the NCAA's Division III. There are nine teams in the conference, all located in the states of Michigan and Indiana. The Michigan Intercollegiate Athletic Association was established on March 24, 1888, making it the oldest college athletic conference in the United States. The current members of the MIAA include Adrian College, Albion College, Alma College, Calvin University, Hope College, Kalamazoo College, Olivet College, Saint Mary's College of Notre Dame, Indiana, and Trine University, formerly known as Tri-State University. Olivet, Alma and Albion are the only charter members remaining in the conference. Former members include such colleges as Michigan State University, previously Michigan Agricultural College, (1888–1907), Eastern Michigan University, previously Michigan State Normal College, (1892–1926), Hillsdale College (1888–1961), and Defiance College (1997–2000).

The members of the MIAA were unchanged from 1961 until 1997 when Defiance College of Ohio and Saint Mary's College of Indiana were invited to join. Defiance College and Saint Mary's College of Indiana were the first colleges from outside of Michigan to be admitted to the conference. Adrian, Albion, Alma, Calvin, Hope, Kalamazoo, Olivet and Saint Mary's have not been members of any other conference. In 2002, the league accepted Wisconsin Lutheran College as an associate member for the purpose of competing only in football. Wisconsin Lutheran College left the MIAA for another conference in 2007. The newest member of the MIAA was accepted in the 2004–05 season, Tri-State University. Tri-State University changed their name to Trine University in 2008.

History

The MIAA conference was established on March 24, 1888, and is the oldest conference in America. The number of sports with competition is 23 (12 men and 11 women sports). These sports include cross country, football, golf, basketball, tennis, swimming, baseball, volleyball, softball, indoor track and field, outdoor track and field, lacrosse, soccer, and men's wrestling. Some past sports that are no longer in competition include bicycle racing, Indian club juggling, archery, and field hockey.

The "Father" of the MIAA, was James Heckman of Hillsdale. Heckman promoted the idea of a permanent league after several schools had sponsored successful track and field days from 1884 to 1887. The first delegates met in Jackson on March 17, 1888, to organize the MIAA. A week after the meeting delegates from Albion, Hillsdale, Michigan State and Olivet drew up the MIAA's first constitution.

The schools that were to be a part of the MIAA in 1888 had diverse enrollment numbers. The largest enrollment belonged to Eastern with 714. Albion was listed as 451, Hillsdale 450, Michigan State 314, Olivet 277, Adrian 150, Hope 148, Kalamazoo 143 and Alma with 95 students. Some of the enrollment figures included many students taking work on a high school level. This meant that athletic teams of those years included both high school and college students. A five or six-year career of athletic participation was not unusual at that time.

On May 31, June 1–2, 1888 the first MIAA track and field meet was held at East Lansing, not even three months after the original meeting. The events that were held included the 100- yard dash, 200-yard dash, 880- yard run, high jump, long jump, shot put, hammer throw and mile relay. Some other events that would not normally be at a track and field meet today, were lawn tennis, wrestling, Indian club swing, horizontal and parallel bar performing, bicycle racing, sparring, and tug-of-war. The teams that competed in this event were Hillsdale, Albion, Michigan State, and Olivet. Hillsdale was the first MIAA track champion.

The following year in 1889, the second annual MIAA Field Day was done. At this Field Day Albion and Olivet participated in an exhibition "football match." It was not until 1891 when the first official intercollegiate football game in the MIAA was played with Albion defeating Hillsdale 36–4. Football was not recognized until 1894 as an official league sport.

The following sports came into effect as follows: Baseball, the 440-yard dash, mile run, high hurdles and pole vault in 1889. Football was recognized as an official league sport in 1894. The two mile run and discus in 1912 and the javelin replaced the hammer throw in 1913. Basketball became a league sport in 1911. Cross country was introduced in 1922 while golf was in 1934. Wrestling was introduced in 1969, but then was dropped in 1981. Soccer in 1970 and swimming in 1971.

Contrary to what many would think that sports for women only started in 1978-79 there is evidence that it started much earlier than that. The first Albion college tennis tournament held six years after the league was formed was actually a co-ed event. In 1936, Albion invited all of the MIAA schools to a play day and convention which was the first attempt to organize a women's athletic program for the MIAA. 100 women from all of the colleges in the MIAA participated in events such as archery, tennis, volleyball, basketball, badminton, softball, and swimming. In 1941 the Athletic Federation of Michigan College Women (AFMCW) was established. It later became known as the Women's Michigan Intercollegiate Athletic Association (WMIAA) in 1946.

In 1977 league presidents voted to allow post-season participation by member schools if they were so invited by the NCAA Division III Football Committee (Harburn 4). This ended a seventeen-year ban on post-season competition. Albion's 1977 team was the first team chosen to participate. Many teams during the ban did not have the chance to show off their skills as some teams were even ranked in the Top Ten nationally, because of the NCAA rule prohibiting more than two teams from the same region being selected (Harburn 4). Hillsdale College left the conference in 1960 because they accepted a bid to a postseason football bowl game and were subsequently suspended two years by the conference.

In 1978–79, the league combined into a single structure the administration of the men's and women's athletic programs of the member schools. This meant that women sports would be included.

Chronological timeline
 1888 - The Michigan Intercollegiate Athletic Association (MIAA) was founded. Charter members included Albion College, Hillsdale College, Olivet College and the State Agricultural College of Michigan (now Michigan State University), effective beginning the 1888-89 academic year.
 1892 - Michigan State Normal School (now Eastern Michigan University) joined the MIAA, effective in the 1892-93 academic year.
 1896 - Kalamazoo College joined the MIAA, effective in the 1896-97 academic year.
 1902 - Eastern Michigan left the MIAA, effective after the 1901-02 academic year.
 1902 - Alma College joined the MIAA, effective in the 1902-03 academic year.
 1907 - Michigan State left the MIAA, effective after the 1906-07 academic year.
 1908 - Adrian College joined the MIAA, effective in the 1908-09 academic year.
 1920 - Eastern Michigan re-joined back to the MIAA, effective in the 1920-21 academic year.
 1922 - Adrian left the MIAA, effective after the 1921-22 academic year.
 1926 - Eastern Michigan left the MIAA for a second time, effective after the 1925-26 academic year.
 1926 - Hope College joined the MIAA, effective in the 1926-27 academic year.
 1937 - Adrian re-joined back to the MIAA, effective in the 1937-38 academic year.
 1940 - Olivet left the MIAA, effective after the 1939-40 academic year.
 1952 - Olivet re-joined back to the MIAA, effective in the 1952-54 academic year.
 1953 - Calvin College joined the MIAA, effective in the 1953-54 academic year.
 1978 - The MIAA would add women's sports, effective in the 1978-79 academic year.
 1997 - Defiance College and Saint Mary's College of Indiana joined the MIAA, effective in the 1997-98 academic year.
 2000 - Defiance left the MIAA to join the Heartland Collegiate Athletic Conference (HCAC), effective after the 1999-2000 academic year.
 2002 - Wisconsin Lutheran College joined the MIAA as an affiliate member for football, effective in the 2002 fall season (2002-03 academic year).
 2004 - Trine University joined the MIAA, effective in the 2004-05 academic year.
 2008 - Wisconsin Lutheran left the MIAA as an affiliate member for football, effective after the 2007 fall season (2007-08 academic year).
 2018 - Finlandia University joined the MIAA as an affiliate member for football, effective in the 2018 fall season (2018-19 academic year).
 2021 - Finlandia left the MIAA as an affiliate member for football, effective after the 2020 fall season (2020-21 academic year).

Winning streaks and distinguished coaches
The MIAA has had its share of many winning seasons, but there are some that may stick out more than others. For example, Kalamazoo College men's tennis has been a part of one that cannot be matched by any other college or university in America. They have won or shared every MIAA Finals championship since 1936, which is 72 consecutive titles (www.miaa.org accessed 5/2/10).  The only times they had to share the title was with Hope College in 1962 and 2003. Some other notable championship streaks include Calvin's men cross country 33 years in a row (active); Calvin's women track & field 27 years in a row.

Since 1990, MIAA member colleges have won 18 National Division III championships. The first MIAA national championship was won by Kalamazoo in 1976 when it won the men's tennis championship (Renner 19). The Kalamazoo College Hornets would later win back-to-back championships in 1986 and 1987 (Renner 19) and again in 1991, 1992, and 1993. NCAA Division III history was made in 1991-92 when the MIAA claimed two national championships in basketball with Calvin winning the men's title and Alma with the women's. The league has had 82 individual NCAA national championship performances since 1978.

The league has had many coaches throughout its history. There are always some coaches that stand out from the rest.  One coach that stands out from the rest is George Acker of Kalamazoo College. Acker was a Phys. Ed Professor and men's tennis coach for 35 years. His impressive resume includes coaching 7 NCAA Division III Championships and 35 MIAA Championships. An impressive 209-1 MIAA career dual-meet record and an overall 537–231 record (www.kzoo.edu/sports/ahof/sport.html accessed October 15, 2008). Acker was the winningest coach in the MIAA. He is followed by John Patnott of Hope College, Tish Loveless (Kalamazoo College), Chester Barnard (Kalamazoo College), and Bob Kent also from Kalamazoo College.

Another such coach was Jare T. Klein of Olivet. As coach of the famed Olivet College wrestling program, Olivet teams won 10 league championships (including 9 straight) in 15 seasons. His team's overall dual meet record during his 29-year coaching tenure was 569 - 119. It appears that Klein may have been a victim to his own success as the MIAA dropped wrestling as a league sport in 1984.

Rivalries
Of course a league will have many rivalries and the MIAA is no different. In a recent interview Jamie Zorbo, head football coach for Kalamazoo College, talked about the tradition of the MIAA and the rivalries. "It is a competitive league; all the teams that are competing have been for a long time and have a lot of history to play for... Great rivalries are made including Kalamazoo vs. Hope; Albion vs. Kalamazoo and the Calvin vs. Hope rivalry in basketball. These are just a few of them." (Zorbo, Jamie. Personal Interview, October 15, 2008).

The Calvin vs. Hope rivalry has actually made national news. ESPN recently identified the nation's greatest college basketball rivalries. Calvin–Hope rivalry tops the Division III and is ranked fourth in all college hoops. ESPN covered this game in 2005 and a "fan poll" was conducted after the game where 80% of the voters voted for Calvin-Hope as number one. It was also covered in July 2007 in an ESPN series  (http://www.hope.edu/pr/athletics/therivalry/index.html accessed October 15, 2008).

Member schools

Current members
The MIAA currently has nine full members, all are private schools:

Notes

Former members
The MIAA had four former full members, one half had public schools, and another half had private schools:

Notes

Former affiliate members
The MIAA had two former affiliate members, both were private schools:

Membership timeline

Sports

Member teams compete in cross country, football (men only), golf, soccer, volleyball (women only), basketball, swimming, baseball (men only), softball (women only), tennis, lacrosse, outdoor track and field, and indoor track and field. As a women's school, Saint Mary's does not participate in football or baseball.

References

External links
 

 
1888 establishments in Michigan